= Rania Hussein Amin =

Egyptian children's writer and illustrator

- Born: 1965 (age 60–61)
- Education: Bachelor of Psychology (1984-1989)
- Occupations: writer, illustrator & psychologist

Rania Hussein Amin (born 1965) (Arabic: رانية حسين أمين) is an Egyptian children's book writer and illustrator. She was known from Farhana's book series, which she also illustrates. Her drawings and writings were published in “Nos El Donia” and “Qatar Al Nada” magazine, in addition to which she wrote more than 45 books and designed book drawings by well-known authors, such as “Me and I” by Michel Hanna. Amin was also one of the educational figures in her career, contributing to the education of children with special needs, and through her books and Farhana's character that she designed, she calls for the practices that parents should follow when raising their children.

== Personal life ==
When she reached the age of twenty, she began writing short stories, and after graduating from university, Amin decided to write children's books, when she designed Farhana's character.

== Education ==
Amin studied at the German school in Cairo (DEO) then received GCE in 1984. Despite Amin's talent in art, she did not enroll in the College of Fine Arts and preferred to study psychology at the American University in Cairo, but she fixed the situation after graduating from the university and joined the free department of the College of Fine Arts, where she studied photography and ceramics. She continued to place her talent in Florence, learned to draw, and participated in a number of group exhibitions there. Throughout her life, Amin has participated as a writer and illustrator in numerous workshops and courses in art, film and animation.

== Professional life ==
=== Art work ===
- 1994: Participated in the Painting exhibition at Salem Salah's studio in Cairo.
- 1995: Participated in the Heliorama Painting exhibition at the French Cultural Center in Cairo
- 1998: Participated in the “Small Art works” exhibition in the “Center of Arts”, Cairo, with 8 paintings.
- 1998-99: Wrote a number of short stories, 4 of them were published in “Nos El-Donya” magazine.
- 1999: Wrote & illustrated a series of 12 books about a character called “Farhana” (published by Elias Publishing House)
- 2000: Translated “Mona & the Tree of Osiris”, “Moody & the Hieroglyphic Gun” and “The Sacred Lake” from English to Arabic (published by Elias Publishing House)
- 2000: Wrote & illustrated a children's book called “When the bird discovered its wings” (published by Elias Publishing House)
- 2001: Wrote & illustrated a children's book called “Siwa”. (published by Elias Publishing House)
- 2002: Participated at the Bologna Bookfair exhibition for Arab Children's books’ illustrators, in Bologna, Italy.
- 2003: Participated in the Comics exhibition in Townhouse Gallery, Cairo.
- 2004: Wrote & illustrated the book “Farhana Imagines (Rapunzel)” 2004: Wrote & illustrated. the book “Farhana Imagines (Jack & Beanstalk)” (Elias Publishing House) (not published)
- 2005: Worked on an animation film about street-children for the UNICEF.
- 2005: Illustrated the book “TV dangers” by Dr. Soheir El-Masry.
- 2006: Wrote & illustrated a 30-pages comic book on female circumcision for “The Childhood & Motherhood Council”
- 2006: Designed & illustrated two school posters about protecting the environment (Elias Publishing House)
- 2006: Wrote the book “Affoor and the bird” (Elias Publishing House)
- 2006: Wrote the book “Fashionable Garbage” (Elias Publishing House)
- 2006: Wrote & illustrated the book “Farhana in Nature” (Elias Publishing House)
- 2006: Wrote & illustrated the book “The Disappearance of the Nile” (Elias Publishing House)
- 2006: Translated the 5-book series “Daisy” for children from English to Arabic (Elias Publishing House)
- 2006: Translated the 6-book series “Cleo” for children from German to Arabic (Elias Publishing House)
- 2006: Translated “Das Maedchen Fragebuch” (for teen-agers) from German to Arabic. (Elias Publishing House)
- 2006: Participated in workshop for creating of a comic book on female-circumcision organized by “The Childhood and Motherhood Council” (creating a 10-page comic story)
- 2007: Wrote & illustrated a motivators’ booklet to raise the awareness in villages on the importance of protecting our environment. (for CENACT)
- 2008: Farhana exhibition in Darb1718 gallery, Cairo, exhibiting a number of photography, scripts and illustrations
- 2008: Writing of TV animation series for children (Baby Boo) (for Al-Sahar cartoon production company) (has not been produced)
- 2009: Wrote & illustrated 4 Farhana books (for 6 – 10-year-old children) (Elias Publishing House)
  - فرحانة وصديق مختلف حقا
  - فرحانة فوحديقة بدون حيوانات
  - فرحانة تتكلم وتتكلم وتتكلم
  - فرحانة وسر جمالها
- 2010: Wrote and illustrated 4 Farhana books (for pre-schoolers) (Elias Publishing House)
  - فرحانة تحب الألوان
  - فرحانة تحب عيد ميلادها
  - فرحانة تحب الأشكال
  - فرحانة تحب المشاركة
- 2010: Edited & participated in writing & illustrating the graphic short story "خارج السيطرة" (published by “El-Ain Publishing House”)
- 2012: Illustrated the graphic short story book “أنا وأنا”, published by Comics Publishing House.
- 2012: Wrote, Illustrated & Published the Mini-Guide for Children about “Bullying” (Hawadit Publishing House)
- 2012: Wrote, Illustrated & Published the comic book for children “One Miserable Bully” (Hawadit Publishing House)
- 2014: Illustrating for El-Delta El-Yom Newspaper & wrote & illustrated in Qatr El Nada magazine
- 2015: Wrote a children's story (Zinnia) and wrote and illustrated a comics (“What’s left of them.. and us”) published in Rowayat magazine for children & teens
- 2015: Wrote & participated in the illustration of “فاقد الحب يعطيه” for early teens, (published by Al-Balsam Publishing house).
- 2015: Wrote & illustrated the educational graphic book “…With Lots of Love” about parenting tips and real life stories done in comics form (Hawadit Publishing House)
- 2016: Wrote "صراخ خلف الأبواب" (A Scream behind Doors) for young adults (Publisher: Nahdet Masr).
- 2017: Wrote برة الدايرة and ورا القناع (novels for young adults) (published by Dar El-Shorouk)
- 2017: Participated in writing the script for the prize-winning short movie “The Mountain” that was shown in “Biennale Venezia 2017” and “AVIFF - Art Film festival 2021” in Cannes
- 2018: Wrote "إفرد ظهرك وارفع رأسك وقل كم أنا جميل" (published by Nahdet Masr)
- 2018: Wrote إسمعني (published by Al-Balsam Publishing House).
- 2018: Wrote الملكة سهيلة a novel for young adults (published by the “Arab Woman Association” and Nahdet Masr)
- 2018: Wrote رافعة الأثقال (published by Nahdet Masr)
- 2019: Wrote أين الابتسامة الحلوة؟ (published by Nahdet Masr)
- 2019: Participated in “ElMazg” workshop to create a comics story about Fear in Folklore, wrote and illustrated an 8-page comics إغتراب
- 2019: Wrote منكوش (published by Dar El Sherouk)
- 2020: Wrote هل أنت سعيد (published by Dar El Shorouk)
- 2020: Wrote and illustrated مش أكلة، مش لعبة، مش أراجوز (Comics for all ages, self-published)
- 2020: Wrote and illustrated the story "إغتراب" published within a collection of graphic short stories by 8 artists from Tunisia and Egypt by Dar El Mahroosa
- 2021: Wrote ذراع ثقيل فوق كتفي (published by Dar El Sherouk)
- 2021: Wrote لماذا هذه الكلبة بالذات؟ (published by Dar El Sherouk)

=== Prizes ===
- 1999: Obtained Suzan Mubarak children's literature prize in illustration on the "فرحانة" series.
- 2000: Obtained Suzan Mubarak children's literature prize in writing on “عندما إكتشف الطائر جناحيه"”
- 2010: Shortlist & nomination of “فرحانة وسر جمالها” (“Itisalat”)
- 2011: Obtained a prize on “فرحانة وصديق مختلف حقا” from Anna Lindh foundation.
- 2012: Obtained a prize from “Arab Thought Foundation” on “Farhana and a Special Friend”
- 2013: Obtained “Kitabi” prize from “El Fikr ElArabi” for the writing & illustration of “When the Bird discovered its Wings”
- 2016: Obtained “Itisalat” first prize for “A Scream behind Doors” for Young Adults.
- 2017: Short list & nomination of فاقد الحب يعطيه ” (“Itisalat”)
- 2021: Shortlist in مسابقة الملتقى العربي for the book هل أنت سعيد
- 2021: Obtained prize for best book for Young Adults for my book الملكة سهيلة in the مسابقة الملتقى العربي
